These are achievements of play on PGA Tour Champions.

Individual scoring records
Stroke totals
72 holes
257 – Pádraig Harrington, 2022 Charles Schwab Cup Championship
54 holes
191 – Bruce Fleisher, 2002 RJR Championship
191 – Loren Roberts, 2006 MasterCard Championship at Hualalai
191 – Bernhard Langer, 2007 Administaff Small Business Classic
191 – David Frost, 2013 3M Championship
191 – Rocco Mediate, 2013 Shaw Charity Classic
191 – Phil Mickelson, 2020 Charles Schwab Series at Ozarks National
36 holes, opening rounds
124 – Bruce Fleisher, 2002 RJR Championship
36 holes, consecutive rounds
124 – Bruce Fleisher, 2002 RJR Championship
18 holes
59 – Kevin Sutherland, 2014 Dick's Sporting Goods Open, second round
9 holes, front or back nine
27 – Jay Sigel, 1998 Bell Atlantic Classic, front nine, second round
27 – Seiji Ebihara, 2002 Senior PGA Championship, front nine, fourth round
Lowest non-winning stroke total, 72 holes
264 – Jay Haas, 2012 Charles Schwab Cup Championship
Lowest non-winning stroke total, 54 holes
192 – Don Pooley, 2006 MasterCard Championship at Hualalai

Strokes to par
72 holes
27-under – Jack Nicklaus, 1990 Mazda Senior Tournament Players Championship
27-under – Pádraig Harrington, 2022 Charles Schwab Cup Championship
54 holes
25-under – Loren Roberts, 2006 MasterCard Championship at Hualalai
25-under – Bernhard Langer, 2007 Administaff Small Business Classic
25-under – David Frost, 2010 3M Championship

Largest leads
54 holes, 72-hole tournament
8 strokes – Jack Nicklaus, 1991 PGA Seniors' Championship
8 strokes – Bernhard Langer, 2014 Senior Open Championship
8 strokes – Bernhard Langer, 2015 Constellation Senior Players Championship
36 holes
8 strokes – Arnold Palmer, 1984 PGA Seniors' Championship
8 strokes – Don Bies, 1989 Murata Seniors Reunion
8 strokes – Larry Nelson, 1998 Pittsburgh Senior Classic
8 strokes – Isao Aoki, 1998 BellSouth Senior Classic at Opryland
8 strokes – Hale Irwin, 1998 Ameritech Senior Open
18 holes
5 strokes – Lee Elder, 1985 Merrill Lynch/Golf Digest Commemorative Pro-Am
5 strokes – Bob Charles, 1988 General Foods PGA Seniors' Championship
5 strokes – Bob Murphy, 1996 Cadillac NFL Golf Classic
5 strokes – Walter Morgan, 1996 Ameritech Senior Open
5 strokes – Allen Doyle, 2000 IR Senior Tour Championship
5 strokes – Nick Price, 2011 Toshiba Classic

Largest winning margins
72 holes
13 strokes – Bernhard Langer, 2014 Senior Open Championship
54 holes
11 strokes – Fred Funk, 2007 Turtle Bay Championship

Miscellaneous
Best scoring average, season
67.96 – Fred Couples, 2010
Most consecutive rounds of par or less
38 – Jay Haas, 2014
Most consecutive sub-par rounds
31 – Gil Morgan, 2000
Most consecutive sub-70 rounds
13 – Hale Irwin, 1999
13 – Corey Pavin, 2010
Lowest start by a winner
60 – Bruce Fleisher, 2002 RJR Championship
60 – Tom Purtzer, 2004 Toshiba Senior Classic
60 – Nick Price, 2011 Toshiba Classic
60 – Michael Allen, 2014 Allianz Championship
Highest start by a winner
77 – Hale Irwin, 1998 U.S. Senior Open
Lowest finish by a winner
61 – Rocky Thompson, 1994 GTE Suncoast Classic
61 – Loren Roberts, 2006 MasterCard Championship at Hualalai
61 – David Frost, 2010 3M Championship
61 – Gary Hallberg, 2010 Ensure Classic at Rock Barn
61 – Fred Couples, 2014 Shaw Charity Classic
Highest finish by a winner
76 – Lee Elder, 1985 Denver Post Champions of Golf
Best birdie streak, round
8 – Chi-Chi Rodríguez, 1987 Silver Pages Classic
8 – Jim Colbert, 2000 TD Waterhouse Championship
8 – Dana Quigley, 2005 Bruno's Memorial Classic
8 – Naomichi Ozaki, 2006 Ford Senior Players Championship
Best eagle-birdie streak, round
1-7 — Jay Sigel, 1998 Bell Atlantic Classic
1-7 — Kevin Sutherland, 2014 Dick's Sporting Goods Open, second round (birdies on holes 1–4, eagle on 5, birdies on 6–8)
Eagles, round
3 – Don January, 1985 Senior PGA Tour Roundup
3 – Jimmy Powell, 1985 The Greenbrier American Express Championship
3 – Rocky Thompson, 1992 Kaanapali Classic
3 – Bruce Lietzke, 2003 MasterCard Championship
3 – Curt Byrum, 2009 Senior Open Championship
3 – Tom Kite, 2011 Greater Hickory Classic at Rock Barn
3 – Jay Don Blake, 2013 Shaw Charity Classic
3 – Tom Lehman, 2016 Mitsubishi Electric Championship at Hualalai
3 – Wes Short Jr., 2016 Tucson Conquistadores Classic
3 – Fran Quinn, 2016 Principal Charity Classic
Fewest putts, round
17 – Bob Brue, 1994 Kroger Senior Classic, second round
Fewest putts, 9 holes
7 – Bob Brue, 1994 Kroger Senior Classic, back nine, second round

Tournament scoring records (full-field)
Highest averages
Event
78.634 – 1989 Murata Seniors Reunion
First round
80.118 – 2005 Senior British Open
Second round
79.420 – 1989 Murata Seniors Reunion
Third round
79.205 – 1990 GTE Kaanapali Classic
Fourth round
76.474 – 1998 Las Vegas Senior Classic

Lowest averages
Event
68.175 – 2005 Blue Angels Classic
First round
68.346 – 2005 Blue Angels Classic
Second round
68.128 – 2005 Blue Angels Classic
Third round
68.051 – 2005 Blue Angels Classic
Fourth round
70.662 – 2003 Senior British Open

Victory records
Career records
Most victories
45 – Bernhard Langer, Hale Irwin
Most victories, Georgia-Pacific Grand Champions
35 – Don January
Most consecutive seasons with a victory
17 – Bernhard Langer, 2007–2023
Most consecutive seasons with multiple victories
11 – Hale Irwin, 1995–2005
Most consecutive victories
4 – Chi-Chi Rodríguez, 1987 Vantage at The Dominion, 1987 United Hospitals Classic, 1987 Silver Pages Classic, 1987 Senior Players Reunion Pro-Am
Most consecutive victories, tour debut
2 – Bruce Fleisher, 1999 Royal Caribbean Classic, 1999 American Express Invitational
Longest time between victories
8 years, 8 months, 28 days – Craig Stadler
Longest time between first and last Champions Tour victories
 15 years, 4 months, 6 days – Bernhard Langer
Longest time between last PGA Tour victory and first Champions Tour victory
28 years, 9 months, 27 days – Mike Fetchick
Winning Georgia-Pacific Grand Champions event and overall tournament
2 – Jimmy Powell, 1995 First of America Classic, 1996 Brickyard Crossing Championship
Most Champions Tour major victories
11 – Bernhard Langer, 2010-2019
Most Senior PGA Championship major victories
4 – Hale Irwin, 1996, 1997, 1998, 2004
Most Senior Players Championship major victories
3 – Bernhard Langer, 2014, 2015, 2016
Most Senior British Open major victories
4 – Bernhard Langer, 2010, 2014, 2017, 2019
Most U.S. Senior Open major victories
3 – Miller Barber, 1982, 1984, 1985
Most The Tradition major victories
4 – Jack Nicklaus, 1990, 1991, 1995, 1996

Season records
Most victories
9 – Peter Thomson, 1985
9 – Hale Irwin, 1997
Most victories, Georgia-Pacific Grand Champions
9 – Joe Jimenez, 1989
9 – Joe Jimenez, 1990
9 – Don January, 1990
9 – Don January, 1991
9 – Jim Ferree, 1993
Most different winners
25 – 1995,  2003
Most first-time winners
11 – 1999
Most rookie winners
5 – 1989, 1999, 2007, 2013 (7 events), 2014
Most multiple winners
10 – 1987, 1988, 1993, 1996, 2001, 2008
Most title defenses
6 – 1991, 2000

Tournament records
Most victories
6 – Hale Irwin, 1997 Hyatt Regency Maui Kaanapali Classic, 2000 EMC Kaanapali Classic, 2001, 2002, 2003, 2005 Turtle Bay Championship
Most consecutive victories
5 – Hale Irwin, 2000 EMC Kaanapali Classic & 2001, 2002, 2003, 2005 Turtle Bay Championship (no event in 2004)
Biggest come-from-behind victory, final round
10 strokes – Jay Sigel, 1994 GTE West Classic

Playoff records
Most playoffs, season
9 – 2002
Most sudden-death holes
10 – 1998 Royal Caribbean Classic
Most players in sudden-death playoff
7 – 2007 Boeing Classic

Single tournament records
Scoring
Most birdies, 72-hole tournament
28 – Jack Nicklaus, 1990 Mazda Senior Tournament Players Championship
Most birdies, 54-hole tournament
26 – Loren Roberts, 2006 MasterCard Championship at Hualalai
26 – Fred Couples, 2011 AT&T Championship
26 – Duffy Waldorf, 2015 Toshiba Classic
Largest scoring swing from one round to the next
21 strokes – Jimmy Powell, 93 to 72 strokes, second and third rounds, 1990 Murata Reunion Pro-Am

Statistics
Best driving distance average
344.2 yards – Andy Bean, 2003 Allianz Championship
Longest drive
422 yards – Jim Dent, 1996 The Tradition
422 yards – Jay Sigel, 1996 The Tradition
Best driving accuracy, 54-hole tournament
42 of 42 fairways – Calvin Peete, 1996 VFW Senior Championship
42 of 42 fairways – Ed Dougherty, 2005 The ACE Group Classic
42 of 42 fairways – Hale Irwin, 2010 Ensure Classic at Rock Barn
Best total driving
2 – Charles Coody, 1990 Las Vegas Senior Classic
2 – Raymond Floyd, 1993 Hyatt Senior TOUR Championship
2 – J. C. Snead, 1996 The Tradition
Best greens in regulation, 54-hole tournament
53 of 54 – John Huston, 2006 Regions Charity Classic
Fewest putts
69 – Lee Elder, 1988 Gus Machado Senior Classic

Age
Youngest winner
50 years, 10 days – Bobby Wadkins, 2001 Lightpath Long Island Classic
Oldest winner
65 years, 5 months, 23 days – Bernhard Langer, 2023 Chubb Classic
Oldest major winner
 – Bernhard Langer, 2019 Senior Open Championship
Youngest to shoot their age or better
61 years old – Walter Morgan, 60 strokes, 2002 AT&T Canada Senior Open Championship
Oldest to shoot their age or better
85 years old – Harold "Jug" McSpaden, 81 strokes, 1994 PGA Seniors' Championship

Awards
Most Jack Nicklaus Trophies
9 – Bernhard Langer, 2008, 2009, 2010, 2014, 2015, 2016, 2017, 2018, 2020-21
Most Arnold Palmer Awards
11 – Bernhard Langer, 2008, 2009, 2010, 2012, 2013, 2014, 2015, 2016, 2017, 2018, 2020-21
Most Charles Schwab Cups
6 – Bernhard Langer, 2010, 2014, 2015, 2016, 2018, 2020-21
Most Charles Schwab Cup points, career
25,680 – Bernhard Langer, 2007–2017 (n.b. system changed in 2018 to make the points equal to money earned on tour that year)
Most Charles Schwab Cup points, season
4,370 – Tom Watson, 2003 (n.b. system changed in 2018 to make the points equal to money earned on tour that year)
Most Charles Schwab Cup money earned, career
$8,200,000 – Bernhard Langer, 2008–2021
Most Champions Tour Comeback Player of the Year Awards
2 – Hubert Green, 2002, 2004
Most Byron Nelson Awards
6 – Bernhard Langer, 2008, 2009, 2014, 2015, 2016, 2018

Miscellaneous records
Earnings
Money earned, career
$34,057,198 – Bernhard Langer, 2007-2023 (as of 2023 Chubb Classic)
Money earned, Georgia-Pacific Grand Champions career
$1,951,663 – Bob Charles
Money earned, season
$3,677,359 – Bernhard Langer, 2017
Money earned, Georgia-Pacific Grand Champions season
$364,988 – George Archer, 2000
Money earned, rookie
$2,515,705 – Bruce Fleisher, 1999
Money earned without a victory, season
$1,549,819 – Tom Kite, 2003
Most consecutive seasons leading money list
7 – Bernhard Langer, 2012–2018
Most years in top 10 on money list
12 – Hale Irwin and Bernhard Langer
Most consecutive years in top 10 on money list
11 – Hale Irwin, 1995–2005
Most consecutive $1-million seasons
11 – Gil Morgan, 1997–2007
Most consecutive $2-million seasons
7 – Bernhard Langer, 2012–2018
Finishes
Most top ten finishes, season
26 – Lee Trevino, 1990
Most top ten finishes, career
210 – Hale Irwin
Most consecutive top five finishes
19 – Hale Irwin, 1997-1998
Most consecutive top ten finishes
36 – Don January, 1980-1984

Participation
Most tournaments played, season
39 – Dana Quigley, 2000
Most consecutive eligible tournaments played
278 – Dana Quigley, 1997-2005
Most consecutive tournaments played
264 – Dana Quigley, 1998-2005
Most rounds played, season
119 – Bruce Summerhays, 1996
119 – Dana Quigley, 1998
119 – Dana Quigley, 1999

Scoring
Most sub-70 rounds, season
59 – Larry Nelson, 2000
Most sub-par rounds, season
82 – Tom Wargo, 1994
Most bogey-free tournaments
4 – Hale Irwin, 1995 Vantage Championship, 1996 American Express Invitational, 1997 Boone Valley Classic, 1997 Vantage Championship
Longest bogey-free streak
98 holes – Morris Hatalsky, 2003

Season statistics
Driving distance (1988–present)
301.5 yards – Steve Thomas, 2009
Driving accuracy (1988–present)
85.87% – Joe Durant, 2014
Total driving (1991–present)
13 – Larry Gilbert, 1993
13 – Joe Durant, 2014
Greens in regulation (1988–present)
78.35% – Bernhard Langer, 2014
Putting (1988–present)
1.693 – Fred Couples, 2010
Sand saves (1988–present)
69.64% – Ron Streck, 2008
All-around (1988–present)
22 – Lee Trevino, 1990

References

External links
Official site

Records
Golf records and rankings